Mauvin Godinho is an Indian politician from the state of Goa. He is a seven term member of the Goa Legislative Assembly.

Political party
He was a senior member of the Indian National Congress. On 13 December 2016, he left the INC to join the rival Bharatiya Janata Party. In 2022, he won the assembly election on BJP ticket from Dabolim constituency.

Constituency
He represents the Dabolim constituency in 2012, and from 1994 to 2012, he represented the Cortalim constituency.

Posts
He won 2017 election with 7234 votes and got elected again as MLA of Dabolim Constituency. He was inducted as Cabinet Minister on 12 April 2017 and later became the Panchayat Minister after getting the Panchayat portfolio in BJP Government.

Committees
Sixth Legislative Assembly 2012
Member		Select Committee on The Goa Land Use
Member		Budget Committee
Member		Committee On Government Assurances
Member		Select Committee on The Goa Commission for Minorities 
Member		Select Committee on The Goa School Education 
Fifth Legislative Assembly 2007
Member		Rules Committee
Chairman		Committee On Privileges
Member		Business Advisory Committee
Member		Select Committee On The Goa Police Bill

External links
 Official website/
Members of the Goa Legislative Assembly

References

Goa MLAs 2022–2027
Living people
Indian National Congress politicians from Goa
Bharatiya Janata Party politicians from Goa
People from South Goa district
Goa MLAs 2017–2022
Year of birth missing (living people)